Tony Swartz (born September 24, 1943 in Iowa as Russell Anthony Swartz; died September 27, 2016 in Missouri) was an American actor whose roles include Flight Sergeant Jolly on the original Battlestar Galactica television series.

Swartz appeared in episodes of The Golden Girls, Kojak and The Invisible Man television series, as well as in a number of television movies.

In 1978, he was cast in Battlestar Galactica, as Flight Sergeant Jolly, the loyal Colonial Warrior and pilot, who was a close friend to Lieutenant Boomer.

Swartz worked on a number of documentary and promotional films.

In addition to acting, his roles in television and film production included working as a location scout, and as a driver.

Married to Helen Blume, his daughter is Kathryn Swartz.

Filmography

References

External links

Tony Swartz - TV.com

1943 births
2016 deaths
American male television actors